The 1976–77 New York Rangers season was the franchise's 51st season. The Rangers placed fourth in the Patrick Division and did not qualify for the playoffs. The Rangers had a better regular season record than two playoff teams and the league would change the rules in the following season to place the top twelve teams in the playoffs, regardless of division.

Regular season

Season standings

Schedule and results

|- align="center" bgcolor="#CCFFCC"
| 1 || 6 || Minnesota North Stars || 6–5 || 1–0–0
|- align="center" bgcolor="#CCFFCC"
| 2 || 8 || @ Colorado Rockies || 5–3 || 2–0–0
|- align="center" bgcolor="#FFBBBB"
| 3 || 9 || @ St. Louis Blues || 2–1 || 2–1–0
|- align="center" bgcolor="#CCFFCC"
| 4 || 12 || @ Minnesota North Stars || 10–4 || 3–1–0
|- align="center" bgcolor="#FFBBBB"
| 5 || 13 || Boston Bruins || 5–1 || 3–2–0
|- align="center" bgcolor="#FFBBBB"
| 6 || 16 || @ Montreal Canadiens || 7–4 || 3–3–0
|- align="center" bgcolor="#CCFFCC"
| 7 || 17 || Colorado Rockies || 4–3 || 4–3–0
|- align="center" bgcolor="#FFBBBB"
| 8 || 20 || Los Angeles Kings || 4–2 || 4–4–0
|- align="center" bgcolor="#FFBBBB"
| 9 || 24 || Vancouver Canucks || 5–4 || 4–5–0
|- align="center" bgcolor="#CCFFCC"
| 10 || 26 || @ Cleveland Barons || 5–2 || 5–5–0
|- align="center" bgcolor="#FFBBBB"
| 11 || 27 || Boston Bruins || 4–3 || 5–6–0
|- align="center" bgcolor="white"
| 12 || 30 || @ Pittsburgh Penguins || 2–2 || 5–6–1
|- align="center" bgcolor="#FFBBBB"
| 13 || 31 || Detroit Red Wings || 6–5 || 5–7–1
|-

|- align="center" bgcolor="#CCFFCC"
| 14 || 3 || @ Vancouver Canucks || 6–1 || 6–7–1
|- align="center" bgcolor="white"
| 15 || 6 || @ Los Angeles Kings || 3–3 || 6–7–2
|- align="center" bgcolor="#FFBBBB"
| 16 || 10 || Washington Capitals || 7–5 || 6–8–2
|- align="center" bgcolor="#FFBBBB"
| 17 || 13 || Buffalo Sabres || 6–2 || 6–9–2
|- align="center" bgcolor="#FFBBBB"
| 18 || 14 || Pittsburgh Penguins || 5–1 || 6–10–2
|- align="center" bgcolor="#CCFFCC"
| 19 || 17 || Chicago Black Hawks || 3–2 || 7–10–2
|- align="center" bgcolor="#FFBBBB"
| 20 || 20 || @ St. Louis Blues || 3–1 || 7–11–2
|- align="center" bgcolor="#CCFFCC"
| 21 || 22 || @ Vancouver Canucks || 3–2 || 8–11–2
|- align="center" bgcolor="white"
| 22 || 24 || @ Philadelphia Flyers || 2–2 || 8–11–3
|- align="center" bgcolor="#CCFFCC"
| 23 || 27 || @ Detroit Red Wings || 5–0 || 9–11–3
|- align="center" bgcolor="#CCFFCC"
| 24 || 28 || Minnesota North Stars || 4–1 || 10–11–3
|- align="center" bgcolor="white"
| 25 || 30 || @ Atlanta Flames || 2–2 || 10–11–4
|-

|- align="center" bgcolor="#CCFFCC"
| 26 || 1 || Washington Capitals || 4–1 || 11–11–4
|- align="center" bgcolor="#CCFFCC"
| 27 || 4 || @ Minnesota North Stars || 11–4 || 12–11–4
|- align="center" bgcolor="white"
| 28 || 5 || Toronto Maple Leafs || 5–5 || 12–11–5
|- align="center" bgcolor="white"
| 29 || 8 || St. Louis Blues || 4–4 || 12–11–6
|- align="center" bgcolor="#FFBBBB"
| 30 || 11 || @ Toronto Maple Leafs || 4–1 || 12–12–6
|- align="center" bgcolor="#CCFFCC"
| 31 || 12 || Montreal Canadiens || 5–2 || 13–12–6
|- align="center" bgcolor="white"
| 32 || 14 || @ New York Islanders || 4–4 || 13–12–7
|- align="center" bgcolor="#FFBBBB"
| 33 || 16 || @ Buffalo Sabres || 7–2 || 13–13–7
|- align="center" bgcolor="white"
| 34 || 18 || @ Chicago Black Hawks || 3–3 || 13–13–8
|- align="center" bgcolor="#CCFFCC"
| 35 || 19 || Cleveland Barons || 3–2 || 14–13–8
|- align="center" bgcolor="white"
| 36 || 22 || Philadelphia Flyers || 3–3 || 14–13–9
|- align="center" bgcolor="white"
| 37 || 23 || @ Boston Bruins || 3–3 || 14–13–10
|- align="center" bgcolor="#FFBBBB"
| 38 || 26 || New York Islanders || 2–1 || 14–14–10
|- align="center" bgcolor="#CCFFCC"
| 39 || 28 || @ Washington Capitals || 5–2 || 15–14–10
|- align="center" bgcolor="#FFBBBB"
| 40 || 31 || Atlanta Flames || 4–2 || 15–15–10
|-

|- align="center" bgcolor="#CCFFCC"
| 41 || 2 || Vancouver Canucks || 5–3 || 16–15–10
|- align="center" bgcolor="white"
| 42 || 5 || Philadelphia Flyers || 4–4 || 16–15–11
|- align="center" bgcolor="white"
| 43 || 7 || @ Colorado Rockies || 4–4 || 16–15–12
|- align="center" bgcolor="#FFBBBB"
| 44 || 9 || Los Angeles Kings || 5–4 || 16–16–12
|- align="center" bgcolor="#FFBBBB"
| 45 || 12 || @ Atlanta Flames || 6–1 || 16–17–12
|- align="center" bgcolor="#FFBBBB"
| 46 || 13 || @ Buffalo Sabres || 7–5 || 16–18–12
|- align="center" bgcolor="#CCFFCC"
| 47 || 16 || @ Chicago Black Hawks || 5–2 || 17–18–12
|- align="center" bgcolor="white"
| 48 || 19 || @ Cleveland Barons || 3–3 || 17–18–13
|- align="center" bgcolor="#FFBBBB"
| 49 || 22 || @ Los Angeles Kings || 6–0 || 17–19–13
|- align="center" bgcolor="#FFBBBB"
| 50 || 23 || @ Vancouver Canucks || 6–2 || 17–20–13
|- align="center" bgcolor="#FFBBBB"
| 51 || 27 || Pittsburgh Penguins || 3–0 || 17–21–13
|- align="center" bgcolor="#CCFFCC"
| 52 || 30 || St. Louis Blues || 5–2 || 18–21–13
|-

|- align="center" bgcolor="#FFBBBB"
| 53 || 1 || @ Colorado Rockies || 5–2 || 18–22–13
|- align="center" bgcolor="#FFBBBB"
| 54 || 3 || @ New York Islanders || 6–3 || 18–23–13
|- align="center" bgcolor="#CCFFCC"
| 55 || 6 || New York Islanders || 4–0 || 19–23–13
|- align="center" bgcolor="#FFBBBB"
| 56 || 9 || Buffalo Sabres || 2–1 || 19–24–13
|- align="center" bgcolor="#CCFFCC"
| 57 || 10 || @ Detroit Red Wings || 5–4 || 20–24–13
|- align="center" bgcolor="#CCFFCC"
| 58 || 13 || Toronto Maple Leafs || 8–3 || 21–24–13
|- align="center" bgcolor="#FFBBBB"
| 59 || 17 || @ Philadelphia Flyers || 7–1 || 21–25–13
|- align="center" bgcolor="#FFBBBB"
| 60 || 19 || @ New York Islanders || 5–2 || 21–26–13
|- align="center" bgcolor="#CCFFCC"
| 61 || 20 || Detroit Red Wings || 3–2 || 22–26–13
|- align="center" bgcolor="#CCFFCC"
| 62 || 23 || @ Toronto Maple Leafs || 5–4 || 23–26–13
|- align="center" bgcolor="#FFBBBB"
| 63 || 26 || @ Chicago Black Hawks || 2–1 || 23–27–13
|- align="center" bgcolor="#FFBBBB"
| 64 || 27 || Montreal Canadiens || 8–1 || 23–28–13
|-

|- align="center" bgcolor="#FFBBBB"
| 65 || 3 || Boston Bruins || 4–1 || 23–29–13
|- align="center" bgcolor="#FFBBBB"
| 66 || 5 || @ Montreal Canadiens || 7–2 || 23–30–13
|- align="center" bgcolor="#CCFFCC"
| 67 || 6 || Cleveland Barons || 4–3 || 24–30–13
|- align="center" bgcolor="#CCFFCC"
| 68 || 9 || Minnesota North Stars || 6–4 || 25–30–13
|- align="center" bgcolor="#FFBBBB"
| 69 || 10 || @ Boston Bruins || 10–3 || 25–31–13
|- align="center" bgcolor="#FFBBBB"
| 70 || 12 || @ Atlanta Flames || 6–3 || 25–32–13
|- align="center" bgcolor="#FFBBBB"
| 71 || 13 || Atlanta Flames || 5–3 || 25–33–13
|- align="center" bgcolor="white"
| 72 || 16 || Philadelphia Flyers || 4–4 || 25–33–14
|- align="center" bgcolor="#CCFFCC"
| 73 || 19 || @ Pittsburgh Penguins || 5–2 || 26–33–14
|- align="center" bgcolor="#CCFFCC"
| 74 || 20 || St. Louis Blues || 5–3 || 27–33–14
|- align="center" bgcolor="#CCFFCC"
| 75 || 23 || Colorado Rockies || 5–3 || 28–33–14
|- align="center" bgcolor="#FFBBBB"
| 76 || 25 || @ Washington Capitals || 7–2 || 28–34–14
|- align="center" bgcolor="#FFBBBB"
| 77 || 27 || Chicago Black Hawks || 5–3 || 28–35–14
|- align="center" bgcolor="#CCFFCC"
| 78 || 30 || Atlanta Flames || 4–3 || 29–35–14
|-

|- align="center" bgcolor="#FFBBBB"
| 79 || 2 || @ Philadelphia Flyers || 4–1 || 29–36–14
|- align="center" bgcolor="#FFBBBB"
| 80 || 3 || New York Islanders || 5–2 || 29–37–14
|-

Playoffs
The Rangers failed to qualify for the 1977 Stanley Cup playoffs.

Player statistics
Skaters

Goaltenders

†Denotes player spent time with another team before joining Rangers. Stats reflect time with Rangers only.
‡Traded mid-season. Stats reflect time with Rangers only.

Draft picks
New York's picks at the 1976 NHL Amateur Draft in Montreal, Quebec, Canada.

References

External links
 Rangers on Hockey Database

New York Rangers seasons
New York Rangers
New York Rangers
New York Rangers
New York Rangers
Madison Square Garden
1970s in Manhattan